The House at 36 Aegean Avenue is a historic home in the Davis Islands neighborhood of Tampa, Florida, United States. It is located at 36 Aegean Avenue. On November 13, 1989, it was added to the U.S. National Register of Historic Places.

References and external links

 Hillsborough County listings at National Register of Historic Places

Houses in Tampa, Florida
History of Tampa, Florida
Houses on the National Register of Historic Places in Hillsborough County, Florida
Mediterranean Revival architecture of Davis Islands, Tampa, Florida
1925 establishments in Florida